Ophioglossum californicum, known by the common name California adder's tongue, is an uncommon species of fern in the family Ophioglossaceae.

The fern is native to California, and Baja California in Northwestern Mexico. It is found in the San Joaquin Valley, Sierra Nevada foothills, and along the central and southern coast regions. Habitats include moist areas, such as wet pastures and vernal pools, coastal grasslands, and coastal/montane/interior chaparral micro-habitats. It becomes very rare in dry years.

Description
Ophioglossum californicum is a small, fleshy perennial plant growing from a caudex no more than 1.5 centimeters wide.

It produces one leaf per year. The leaf is divided into a thick, green blade-shaped part, which is sterile, and a fertile stalk lined with two rows of sporangia, the reproductive parts.

See also
California coastal sage and chaparral ecoregion
California montane chaparral and woodlands
California interior chaparral and woodlands

References

External links
Jepson Manual Treatment for Ophioglossum californicum
USDA Plants Profile of Ophioglossum californicum
Flora of North America: Ophioglossum californicum
Ophioglossum californicum — U.C. Photo gallery

californicum
Ferns of the Americas
Ferns of California
Ferns of Mexico
Flora of Baja California
Flora of California
Flora of the Sierra Nevada (United States)
Natural history of the California chaparral and woodlands
Natural history of the Central Valley (California)
Plants described in 1883
Flora without expected TNC conservation status